John Robert William Nutter (born 13 June 1982) is an English former professional footballer who played as a left-back.

Nutter began his career at Blackburn Rovers' youth academy in 1998, spending two years at the club before being released. In early 2001, he joined Wycombe Wanderers, and later signed for Aldershot Town in May 2001. He enjoyed a promotion with Aldershot during the 2002–03 campaign, helping the club secure the Isthmian League Premier Division title. During his time at Aldershot, Nutter spent time out on loan at St Albans City and Gravesend & Northfleet respectively.

Nutter then enjoyed a fruitful two-year spell at Grays Athletic, and was part of the team that won the Conference South title, as well as two FA Trophy successes. In May 2006, he signed for Stevenage Borough, and again enjoyed FA Trophy success during the 2006–07 season. Nutter moved back into the Football League in November 2007, signing for Gillingham. He spent three-and-a-half seasons there, with the club moving between League One and League Two during his tenure. He was released when his contract expired at the end of the 2010–11 campaign, subsequently signing for Lincoln City of the Conference Premier in July 2011. He was loaned out to Woking in November 2012, a move that was later made permanent in January 2013. He spent two years at Woking, retiring from playing at the end of the 2014–15 season to enable him to focus further on his career as a teacher.

Club career

Early career
Nutter began his career at Blackburn Rovers' youth academy, joining the club's YTS programme in 1998 at the age of 16, before later signing a scholarship with the club. During his time at Blackburn, he was part of the team that won the under-17 Academy Cup as they beat Manchester City in the final. He was released by Blackburn in 2000, and was subsequently signed by Wycombe Wanderers in the early part of 2001. Nutter made one first-team appearance for the club, making his Football League debut in the club's 3–2 away defeat to Peterborough United on 24 February 2001. He was also part of the squad that travelled to the FA Cup semi-final against Liverpool at Villa Park, although did not feature. His time at Wycombe was hampered by an ankle injury, which resulted in "limited opportunities". He subsequently left Wycombe at the end of the 2000–01 season.

In May 2001, Nutter joined Aldershot Town, then of the Isthmian League Premier Division. He made his debut in Aldershot's 3–1 home victory over Enfield on 18 August 2001, and scored his first goal for the club shortly after in a 2–1 away win over Heybridge Swifts. Nutter made 19 appearances for Aldershot during the 2001–02 season, scoring twice. He also made eight appearances for divisional rivals St Albans City during a two-month loan spell. He spent a month on loan at Conference National club Gravesend & Northfleet in November 2002, making four appearances. During the campaign, he scored three times in 21 appearances for Aldershot, in a season that saw the club earn promotion to the Conference National after winning the Isthmian League Premier Division. Nutter played regularly during Aldershot's return to the highest tier of non-League football, making 28 appearances in all competitions and scoring once in a 4–2 away victory over Bishop's Stortford in the FA Trophy in January 2004. Aldershot missed out on back-to-back promotions, losing on penalties in the play-off final to Shrewsbury Town. Although Nutter did not play in the final, he did feature in both legs of the semi-final as Aldershot defeated Hereford United on penalties. During his three years at Aldershot, Nutter made 68 appearances in league, FA Cup and FA Trophy fixtures, scoring six times.

Grays Athletic
Ahead of the 2004–05 season, in July 2004, Nutter signed for Conference South club Grays Athletic, managed by Mark Stimson. He made his Grays debut on the opening day of the season, playing the first 57 minutes in a 1–1 away draw against Hayes on 14 August 2004. Three days later, he scored his only goal of the season as Grays beat Redbridge 4–1 at the New Recreation Ground. In Nutter's first season with Grays, the club achieved promotion by winning the Conference South title by 23 points. During the same season, Grays also won the FA Trophy, beating Hucknall Town on penalties in the final at Villa Park, with Nutter playing the whole match. As a result of Grays' promotion, the 2005–06 season gave Nutter another opportunity to play in the Conference National. He played regularly during the season as Grays finished third in the league. His only goal of the season came in the Conference play-off semi-final second leg, as Grays lost to Halifax Town 5–4 on aggregate. Shortly after the play-off defeat, Nutter was part of the team that earned back-to-back FA Trophy titles courtesy of a 2–0 victory against Woking at Upton Park in the 2006 FA Trophy Final. It was to be Nutter's last game for the club. On securing successive FA Trophy victories with Grays, Nutter stated – "The FA Trophy wins for Grays Athletic were great, a fantastic achievement for the club, we had some terrific players at the time".

Stevenage Borough
With his Grays contract expiring, Nutter opted to sign for Conference National club Stevenage Borough on 31 May 2006. He joined on a free transfer and on a two-year contract. The move reunited him with Stimson, who made Nutter his first signing following his switch from Grays to Stevenage. Nutter revealed that he had rejected the offer of a contract extension at Grays, as well as an offer from Peterborough United. He made his Stevenage debut against Altrincham on 12 August 2006, playing the whole match in a 2–1 away defeat. Nutter scored his first goal for Stevenage in a 3–2 victory win against Woking on 3 October 2006, a late penalty to restore parity in the match, before Stevenage went on to score a winner in injury-time. He went on to score further penalties in home victories against Gravesend & Northfleet and Cambridge United, and also scored against Burton Albion with a shot from 25-yards in a 2–1 win. He was ever-present during his first season with the club, playing in all 46 leagues matches, as well as making a further 10 appearances in cup competitions, scoring six times. Nutter was part of the squad that reached the 2007 FA Trophy Final in May 2007, the first competitive match at the new Wembley Stadium. He played the whole match in Stevenage's 3–2 victory against Kidderminster Harriers, a game in which Stevenage trailed by two goals, meaning he had won the FA Trophy for three successive years.

Nutter scored his first goal of the 2007–08 season in Stevenage's 3–0 home victory over Weymouth in August 2007, scoring a free kick that found the top corner of the goal. He was part of the defence that broke a club record and equalled a Conference Premier record when Stevenage went eight games without conceding a goal, from August to October 2007. Following the departure of Stimson to Gillingham in November 2007, it was revealed that Stevenage rejected several offers for Nutter from Gillingham. He remained at Stevenage for a further three weeks; his last game for the club a 3–2 home loss to Halifax Town. He scored eight times in 73 appearances for the club in all competitions.

Gillingham

Later that month, Nutter joined Gillingham, along with Stevenage midfielder Adam Miller, for a combined fee of £65,000. The move was initially on loan until January 2008, when the deal was made permanent. He made his debut for Gillingham in a 1–1 home draw with Southend United on 26 December 2007, playing the whole match. Nutter went on to make 25 appearances for the club during the second half of the 2007–08 campaign, a season that witnessed Gillingham suffer relegation to League Two. He scored one goal during the campaign, netting in a 1–1 draw against Bristol Rovers at the Memorial Stadium in April 2008. The 2008–09 campaign was Nutter's first full season at Gillingham. He had been joined by former Stevenage players Barry Fuller, Alan Julian, and Stuart Lewis, as well as Dennis Oli, who he played alongside at Grays. Nutter made 54 appearances during the campaign, a season in which Gillingham earned promotion back to League One following a 1–0 win over Shrewsbury Town in the play-off final at Wembley Stadium in May 2009. He provided 11 assists from left-back during the season. The promotion meant that it was the third of Nutter's career, having also enjoyed league success at Aldershot and Grays.

Nutter started in the club's first game of the 2009–10 season; as Gillingham marked their return to the third tier of English football with a 5–0 victory over Swindon Town at Priestfield. He scored his only goal of the campaign, the second of his Gillingham career, in a 3–1 win over bottom-placed Stockport County in December 2009, marking his 100th appearance for the club with an "angled volley" that beat Owain Fôn Williams in the Stockport goal. Gillingham were relegated at the end of the season, finishing in 21st place. A 3–0 away loss to one of Nutter's former employers, Wycombe Wanderers, cemented their fate. Nutter made 41 appearances during the campaign. Stimson left the club by mutual consent days after the Wycombe match, and was replaced by Andy Hessenthaler. This meant that Nutter would be playing under a manager other than Stimson for the first time in six years (aside from a three-week spell under Peter Taylor at Stevenage). Nutter's contract was extended for a further year in June 2010 after he had "played sufficient games last season to trigger a new deal". During the season, Nutter received the first red card of his career in a 2–0 home defeat to Dover Athletic in the FA Cup, earning the dismissal for a "professional foul". He made 37 appearances during the 2010–11 season, scoring once, as Gillingham narrowly missed out on a place in the play-offs. In May 2011, Nutter left Gillingham when his contract expired at the end of the month. During his three-and-a-half year spell with the Kent club, he made 157 appearances and scored three goals.

Lincoln City
Nutter joined Conference Premier club Lincoln City on a free transfer in July 2011. Signing a two-year deal with Lincoln, Nutter stated – "I think it will benefit me to have a fresh start, play in front of new people and show what I can do. I feel I'm better than this level but I've got to show that and we have to show that as a team". His Lincoln debut came on the opening day of the 2011–12 season, playing the whole match as Lincoln drew 2–2 with Southport at Haig Avenue. He scored his first goal for the club on 26 November 2011, scoring Lincoln's third with a shot from outside the area in a 3–0 home victory over Ebbsfleet United. Nutter scored a 20-yard free-kick in a 2–0 win against relegation rivals Newport County on 24 March 2012. Nutter played in all 51 of Lincoln's matches during the season, with the club struggling to adapt during their first season back in non-League, finishing just above the relegation places.

He was made club captain ahead of the 2012–13 season, and continued to play regularly during the early months of the new campaign. He scored his first goal of the season from a free-kick in a 3–3 home draw against Stockport County on 27 October 2012. Nutter admitted that his family struggled relocating to Lincolnshire, and a move down south was a much more suitable location given his personal circumstances. He scored three times in 66 appearances for Lincoln. On his time at Lincoln, Nutter stated – "Lincoln is a really nice, friendly club with very patient and loyal supporters. But with my personal circumstances, it was time to move on – I wish them well".

Woking
He joined fellow Conference Premier club Woking on a two-month loan deal on 15 November 2012. He made his first appearance for Woking two days after signing, playing the whole match in a 2–1 defeat to Alfreton Town at Kingfield, and went on to make a further four appearances during the loan agreement. He briefly returned to Lincoln, before it was agreed that he would leave the club by mutual consent at the end of 2012. Nutter subsequently signed for Woking on a permanent basis on 6 January 2013. He was ever-present at left-back for the remainder of the season, adding 17 further appearances to his five loan appearances as Woking finished their first season back in the Conference in mid-table. Nutter remained at Woking for the 2013–14 season, making his first appearance of the season against his former employers, Lincoln City, in a 0–0 draw at Kingfield on 10 August 2013. He scored his first and only goal for Woking in the club's 2–0 away win at Gateshead on 15 February 2014, converting Kevin Betsy's cross after just two minutes to give Woking the lead and help the club on their way to their first away win of the year. He was once again a mainstay in the team throughout the whole of the season, making 50 appearances in all competitions and scoring once.

Nutter was out of contract heading into the 2014–15 season, but after discussions with manager Garry Hill and coach Steven Thompson, he signed a contract extension with Woking, on non-contract terms, in August 2014. The contract was non-contract terms because Nutter was combining playing football alongside his new job as a teacher and therefore had to take on a part-time playing role. He also thanked the club for their understanding in his new role, especially given the recent death of his mother. Nutter started in the club's first game of the season, a 3–1 away victory at Alfreton Town on 9 August 2014. He played a largely peripheral role during the season, making seven appearances in all competitions as his new job commitments meant first-team opportunities were sparse. Nutter retired at the end of the season to focus fully on his teaching job.

International career
Nutter played for the England C team, who represent England at non-league level, three times in 2007. He has also made several appearances for the England futsal team.

Style of play
Nutter predominantly played as a left-sided full-back, although he did play on the left wing in the early stages of his career. He is left-footed. Gillingham manager Mark Stimson described him as "an attacking full-back with plenty of technical ability", and stated that Nutter would "offer plenty of width down the left hand side", in-turn being "a constant attacking threat". He expressed a passion to pass the ball along the floor, and always prefers to pass the ball out as opposed to playing long ball. Talking about his time at Stevenage, Nutter stated he would like to be remembered as a player "who tried to play football the right way, passing the ball, technically good to watch and an honest player".

He also provided an attacking outlet from set-pieces. Throughout his career, Nutter scored from several long-range free-kicks, and also regularly took corner kicks. During his time at Stevenage, he was the club's penalty taker, and scored six out of seven penalties.

Personal life
Nutter is married to Hayley and as of 2011 had two sons, Walter and Benedict.  Walter plays for the Chelsea F.C. Academy.   Nutter has a brother and a sister; his brother, Tom, played football for Burnham and Beaconsfield SYCOB, and won a number of awards during four years in America playing for West Texas A&M University.  

Nutter has stated that his closest friend in football is Adam Miller, whom he played alongside at Stevenage and Gillingham.  Nutter studied Sports Psychology and Coaching at the University of Buckingham. He took up a position teaching physical education, science and history at the Papplewick School in Ascot in the summer of 2014.

Career statistics

Honours
Aldershot Town
 Isthmian League Premier Division: 2002–03

Grays Athletic
 Conference South: 2004–05
 FA Trophy: 2004–05, 2005–06

Stevenage Borough
 FA Trophy: 2006–07

Gillingham
 League Two play-offs: 2008–09

References

External links

1982 births
Living people
English footballers
England semi-pro international footballers
Association football defenders
Wycombe Wanderers F.C. players
Aldershot Town F.C. players
St Albans City F.C. players
Ebbsfleet United F.C. players
Grays Athletic F.C. players
Stevenage F.C. players
Gillingham F.C. players
Lincoln City F.C. players
Woking F.C. players
English Football League players
National League (English football) players